Rumble Racing is a 2001 racing video game developed and published by Electronic Arts for the PlayStation 2 console. It was heavily influenced by NASCAR Rumble.

Reception

The game received "favorable" reviews according to the review aggregation website Metacritic. Kevin Rice of NextGen called it "a pretty, fun arcade racer with hours of replayability. But the memorization required of players and level of difficulty can be a turn-off."

Marc Saltzman of The Cincinnati Enquirer gave it a score of four stars out of five, calling it "one fast game — redrawing the graphics on the screen at roughly 60 frames-per-second (twice that of television) — so those with a need for speed should strap in for a ride." Later, when writing for Playboy, he gave it 85%, saying, "Indeed, the cheesy southern rock 'n' redneck country tunes can get annoying after a while, and the smart-ass remarks made by the play-by-play commentator tend to repeat more often than not, but it hardly detracts from the overall, seat-of-your-pants racing." Maxim gave it four stars out of five, saying, "There aren't many games more extreme than this crazed, balls-to-the wall stock-car racer."

The game was nominated for the "Best Driving Game" award at GameSpots Best and Worst of 2001 Awards, which went to Gran Turismo 3: A-Spec.

Notes

References

External links

2001 video games
Electronic Arts games
PlayStation 2 games
PlayStation 2-only games
Racing video games
Video games developed in the United States